Strelci is a village in the municipality of Kičevo, North Macedonia. It used to be part of the former municipality of Oslomej.

Demographics
As of the 2021 census, Strelci had 1,078 residents with the following ethnic composition:
Albanians 1,009
Persons for whom data are taken from administrative sources 67
Others 2

According to the 2002 census, the village had a total of 1,421 inhabitants. Ethnic groups in the village include:
Albanians 1,409
Others 12

References

External links

Villages in Kičevo Municipality
Albanian communities in North Macedonia